The Call of the Wild is a 2020 American adventure film based on Jack London's 1903 novel of the same name. Directed by Chris Sanders, in his live-action directorial debut, and his first film without a co-director, the film was written by Michael Green, and stars Harrison Ford, Omar Sy, Cara Gee, Dan Stevens, Karen Gillan, and Bradley Whitford. Set during the 1890s Klondike Gold Rush, the film follows a dog named Buck as he is stolen from his home in California and sent to the Yukon, where he befriends an old outdoorsman and begins a life-altering adventure.

The Call of the Wild was released in the United States on February 21, 2020, by 20th Century Studios (its first film under the company's new name). It received mixed reviews from critics, who praised Ford's performance, John Powell’s music and the "entertaining action and earnest tone" but criticized the "uncanny valley" effect of the CGI animals. Due to the COVID-19 pandemic, it was a box-office disappointment, grossing $111 million against a production budget of $125–150 million, and lost the studio an estimated $50–100 million.

Plot 
During the late 19th century, Buck, a large, gentle mix of Saint Bernard and Scotch Shepherd, lives contentedly with his master, Judge Miller, in Santa Clara, California. One night, Buck is abducted and shipped to the Yukon aboard a freighter. During the packing, Buck finds his favorite chew toy but loses his collar in the process due to it loosely falling off and sliding out of the truck. During the voyage, a crew member beats him as a means of discipline. After arriving, Buck returns a dropped harmonica to a man named John Thornton, moments before being sold to Perrault and his assistant Francoise for their dog sled to deliver mail across the Yukon. Perrault hopes that with Buck, he can make the long trek to the mail depot before the deadline. Buck is introduced to the other dogs; Dolly, Pike, Jo, Billie, Dub, Dave, and Sol-leks, including the vicious pack leader, a husky named Spitz.

Throughout their travels, Buck gains the loyalty and trust of Perrault, Francoise and the other sled dogs, after proving himself along the way and even rescuing Francoise, antagonizing Spitz. Buck begins experiencing ancestral spiritual visions of a black wolf that acts as his guide throughout their travels. One night, Buck catches and then releases a rabbit. Spitz kills it before attacking Buck to assert his dominance. Spitz seems to win, until the rest of the pack encourages Buck, who pins Spitz down, displacing him as pack leader; Spitz then disappears into the wild. Perrault grudgingly makes Buck the lead when no other dog assumes the position. Buck's speed and strength allow the sled to arrive with the mail on time. There, Thornton hands over a letter he has written to his former wife expressing his feelings about their dead son. When Perrault returns, he learns the mail route is being replaced by the telegraph, forcing him to sell the dogs.

Hal, a mean-spirited and inexperienced gold prospector, buys the pack and gradually works them to exhaustion carrying a heavy load in weather unsuitable for sledding. The exhausted dogs stop to rest before Hal can force them to cross an unstable frozen lake. When Buck refuses to move, Hal threatens to shoot him. Thornton appears and rescues Buck while Hal forces the other sled dogs to cross the lake. Under Thornton's care, Buck recovers. Later, at a saloon, Thornton is attacked by Hal, who reveals the dogs managed to run off leaving him with nothing. Witnessing the scene, Buck attacks Hal who is subsequently thrown out. Buck and Thornton then travel beyond the Yukon map where they can freely live in the wild. They come across an abandoned cabin in an open valley and settle in. Meanwhile, Hal relentlessly hunts them, believing Thornton is hiding gold.

In the open wilderness, Thornton and Buck bond over their daily activities, primarily fishing and gold panning. Throughout their time together, Buck is drawn to a female white wolf. Going back and forth between Thornton and the white wolf, Buck is conflicted about his domesticated life with Thornton and his place with the wolf pack that the female belongs to. After some time together Thornton believes it is time to return home. Never wanting the gold from the start, Thornton throws it all back into the river and tells Buck he is leaving in the morning, and to come and say good-bye. Buck heads into the forest and sleeps beside the white wolf, clearly conflicted. Hal subsequently finds and shoots Thornton. Buck returns and kills Hal by pushing him into the cabin, which has caught on fire. Thornton wants Buck to live for himself and hugs him as he dies reassuring him with his final words, "It's okay, boy. You're home."

The next morning, Buck returns to the hills looking down on the burnt out cabin with sadness. In the wilderness Buck shows that he mates and has offspring with the white wolf and becomes the pack leader, fully embracing the call of the wild.

Cast 
 Terry Notary as Buck, an enormous, gentle, kind-hearted dog who is a mix of Saint Bernard and Scotch Shepherd. His model was scanned after an adopted dog.
 Harrison Ford as John Thornton, an experienced frontiersman and Buck's fourth master 
 Omar Sy as Perrault, a French-Canadian mail runner and Buck's second master
 Dan Stevens as Hal, Charles’ brother-in-law, Mercedes’ brother and Buck's third master who abuses him and his fellow dogs
 Cara Gee as Françoise, a First Nations mail runner and Perrault's assistant 
 Karen Gillan as Mercedes, Hal's spoiled sister and Charles’ wife.
 Bradley Whitford as Judge Miller, Buck's first master who spoils him
 Jean Louisa Kelly as Katie Miller, Judge Miller's wife
 Colin Woodell as Charles, Mercedes' cowardly husband and Hal's brother-in-law
 Michael Horse as Edenshaw, Native-American friend of John Thornton

Production 

In October 2017, it was announced that 20th Century Fox was developing a new film adaptation of Jack London's 1903 novel The Call of the Wild, set in the Yukon during the 1890s Klondike Gold Rush. The film was set to be directed by Chris Sanders from a script by Michael Green, and produced by Erwin Stoff. In July 2018, Harrison Ford and Dan Stevens were cast in the film, with Ford starring as John Thornton, who goes on the search for gold. In August 2018, Colin Woodell joined the cast. In September, Omar Sy and Karen Gillan were added, while Bradley Whitford came aboard in October, and Cara Gee joined in November.

Principal photography on the film began in late September 2018 in Los Angeles. The film was not shot on location, as extensive use was made of CGI, with some scenes also being filmed on sets in Los Angeles and exteriors in Santa Clarita, California. All in all, the production spent $109 million filming in California, with the final budget reaching $125–150 million by the time post-production wrapped. The visual effects were provided by Moving Picture Company (MPC), led by MPC's studio in Montreal, with Erik Nash serving as vfx supervisor, and also by Soho VFX and Technoprops. The production team used computer animation to create a realistic version of the dog 'Buck'.

Music 
In January 2019, it was announced that John Powell would compose the film's score. Powell previously collaborated with Sanders on the 2010 DreamWorks Animation film How to Train Your Dragon.

Recording primarily took place in Los Angeles at the Newman Scoring Stage, with Powell conducting a 90-piece orchestra, as well as employing a 60-voice choir for the score. Joining him were regular composers Batu Sener and Paul Mounsey, who provided additional music. The soundtrack was released digitally on February 21, 2020, by Hollywood Records.

All music was composed and conducted by John Powell.

"Piano Solos" album
In October 2020, Powell released the album Piano Solos from The Call of the Wild. The album features ten tracks from Powell's original score, arranged for solo piano and performed by Batu Sener, a composer and musician who is Powell's frequent collaborator (including on The Call of the Wild). The arrangements from this album are printed and distributed by Hal Leonard Publishing Company. The album was released by Powell's own record label, 5 Cat Studios. This is the second "piano solos" album from Powell and Sener, the first being Piano Solos from How to Train Your Dragon: The Hidden World, released in May 2020.

Release 
The film was originally set to be released on December 25, 2019, but was pushed back to February 21, 2020, following the acquisition of Fox by Disney, to accommodate the December releases of Star Wars: The Rise of Skywalker and Spies in Disguise. The Call of the Wild was also the first film released by 20th Century Studios, following its rebranding from 20th Century Fox by its parent Walt Disney Studios division. Coincidentally, the 1935 adaptation of the novel was the last film released under the Twentieth Century Pictures name before it merged with Fox Film to form 20th Century Fox. The film's theatrical release in China was delayed until November 13, 2020, due to the COVID-19 pandemic.

The Call of The Wild was released digitally on the night of March 27, 2020. The announcement followed Disney's earlier-than-planned releases of Frozen II and Onward on digital, due to the COVID-19 pandemic resulting in the closing of most theatres around the world. The film was released on DVD, Blu-ray, and Ultra HD Blu-ray on May 12, 2020, by Walt Disney Studios Home Entertainment through the 20th Century Home Entertainment label.

Reception

Box office
The Call of the Wild grossed $62.3 million in the United States and Canada, and $48.5 million in other territories, for a worldwide total of $110.8 million. Its high production and marketing costs mean the film needed to gross $250–275 million in order to break even; various publications estimated it would lose the studio between $50–100 million.

In the United States and Canada, the film was released alongside Brahms: The Boy II and Impractical Jokers: The Movie as well as the wide expansion of The Lodge, and was projected to gross $15–20 million from 3,752 theaters in its opening weekend. The film made $8 million on its first day, including $1 million from Thursday night previews. It went on to overperform, debuting to $24.8 million and finishing second, behind holdover Sonic the Hedgehog; however, Deadline Hollywood wrote that "despite the over-indexing of Call of the Wild stateside, it's a hollow victory, given how much the film cost". The film made $13.2 million in its second weekend and $7 million on its third weekend, respectively finishing third and fifth.

Critical response
On Rotten Tomatoes, the film has an approval rating of 63% based on 208 reviews, with an average rating of 6/10. The website's critics consensus reads: "It's undermined by distracting and unnecessary CGI, but this heartwarming Call of the Wild remains a classic story, affectionately retold." On Metacritic, the film has a weighted average score of 48 out of 100, based on 44 critics, indicating "mixed or average reviews". Audiences polled by CinemaScore gave the film an average grade of "A−" on an A+ to F scale, and PostTrak reported it received an average 4 out of 5 stars, with 59% of people surveyed saying they would definitely recommend it.

Owen Gleiberman of Variety praised Harrison Ford's performance, saying that he "acts with pure soul here (he also narrates the film with his lovely storybook growl); it's a minimalist performance, mostly very reactive, but the saintly gruffness of Ford’s thick-gray-bearded, sad-eyed presence helps to nudge Buck to life as a character."

Common Sense Media rated the movie 4 out of 5 stars, stating: "Parents need to know that The Call of the Wild is a family-friendly adaptation of Jack London's classic novel. Starring Harrison Ford, it's a simpler, somewhat sanitized take on the book -- which makes it more appropriate for younger viewers -- but the themes and messages of London's story are still as crisp as a Yukon sunrise."

Accolades

References

External links 
 
 
 

2020 adventure films
2020s children's adventure films
2020s English-language films
American adventure films
Films based on American novels
Films shot in Los Angeles
20th Century Studios films
3 Arts Entertainment films
TSG Entertainment films
Remakes of American films
Films set in Yukon
Films set in the 1890s
Films using motion capture
Films directed by Chris Sanders
Films based on The Call of the Wild
Films about dogs
Films about wolves
American films with live action and animation
Films with screenplays by Michael Green (writer)
Films scored by John Powell
American children's drama films
American children's adventure films
Films produced by Erwin Stoff
Films produced by James Mangold
2020s American films